Delson Ferreira (born 26 July 1980), known as Delson, is a Brazilian retired footballer who played as defensive midfielder. He also held a Portuguese passport.

Football career
Born in Uberaba, Minas Gerais, Delson began playing with Grêmio Esportivo Inhumense, moving to Portugal in 2001 to represent S.C. Salgueiros (by then in the Primeira Liga). He made his debut in the competition on 16 September 2001, playing 90 minutes in a 1–0 home win against S.C. Braga.

As the club from Paranhos folded after the 2003–04 season, Delson joined Rio Ave FC, where he became an instant first-choice. After suffering relegation in 2006, he contributed with 24 matches and two goals to the team's return to the top division after two years.

In late June 2009, Delson signed with Greece's Athlitiki Enosi Larissa FC. In January of the following year, however, he returned to Portugal, helping lowly S.C. Olhanense retain its top flight status and moving to the Algarve side permanently at end of the campaign.

References

External links

1980 births
Living people
People from Uberaba
Brazilian footballers
Association football midfielders
Primeira Liga players
Liga Portugal 2 players
S.C. Salgueiros players
Rio Ave F.C. players
S.C. Olhanense players
Associação Naval 1º de Maio players
Super League Greece players
Athlitiki Enosi Larissa F.C. players
Vitória FC Riboque players
Brazilian expatriate footballers
Expatriate footballers in Portugal
Expatriate footballers in Greece
Expatriate footballers in São Tomé and Príncipe
Brazilian expatriate sportspeople in Portugal
Brazilian expatriate sportspeople in São Tomé and Príncipe
Sportspeople from Minas Gerais